December 16 - Eastern Orthodox liturgical calendar - December 18

All fixed commemorations below celebrated on December 30 by Orthodox Churches on the Old Calendar.

For December 17th, Orthodox Churches on the Old Calendar commemorate the Saints listed on December 4.

Saints
 Holy Prophet Daniel (600 BC) and the Three Holy Youths: Ananias, Azarias, and Misael.
 Monk-martyrs Patermuthius and Coprius, and Martyr Alexander the Soldier, of Egypt (361-363)
 Martyr Bacchus (Iakchos), from Triglia, by the sword.
 Venerable Daniel the Confessor (Stephen the Confessor in schema) of Spain and Egypt (10th century)
  Saints Athanasius, Nicholas, and Anthony, disciples of Athanasius the Athonite and founders of Vatopedi monastery, Mt. Athos (10th century)

Pre-Schism Western saints
 Saint Maxentiolus (Mezenceul), a disciple of St Martin of Tours in France, he founded Our Lady of Cunault (5th century)
 Saint Tydecho of Wales, brother of Saint Cadfan (6th century)
 Saint Briarch, born in Ireland, became a monk in Wales with St Tudwal, whom he accompanied to Brittany, built a monastery in Guingamp and reposed in Bourbiac (c. 627)
 Saint Judicaël, son of Hoel and king of Domnonia and Brittany, much loved by his people, spent the last twenty years of his life in the monastery of Gäel near Vannes (658)
 Saint Begga, founder and Abbess of a convent in Andenne on the Meuse in Belgium (698)
 Saint Sturm (Sturmius), Abbot and Apostle of Saxony, founder of Fulda Monastery (Germany) (779)
 Saint Eigil of Fulda, the fourth abbot of Fulda (822)

Post-Schism Orthodox saints
 New Martyr Nicetas of Nyssa (c. 1300)
 Saint Dionysios of Zakynthos, Archbishop of Aegina (1624)
 Saint Misael of Abalatsk, Hieromonk (1797)
 New Hieromartyrs Paisius, Abbot of Trnava (Turnovo), Cacak (1814), and Abbacum, Deacon (1815), at Belgrade.

New martyrs and confessors
 New Hieromartyr Sergius Florinsky, Priest of Rakvere, Estonia (1918)  (see also: July 2 )
 New Hieromartyr Nicholas Beltiukov, Protopresbyter of Perm (1918)
 New Hieromartyr Alexander Savelov, Priest of Perm (1918)
 New Hieromartyr John Zemlyani, Priest of Alma-Ata (1937)
 New Hieromartyr Peter Pokrovsky, Priest (1937)

Other commemorations
 Repose of Elder Hadji George of Mt. Athos (1886)
 Repose of Hiero-schemamonk Daniel (Sandu Tudor), poet of Romania (1962)
 Repose of lay elder Panagis of Ilami, Cyprus (1989)

Icon gallery

Notes

References

Sources
 December 17/30. Orthodox Calendar (PRAVOSLAVIE.RU).
 December 30 / December 17. HOLY TRINITY RUSSIAN ORTHODOX CHURCH (A parish of the Patriarchate of Moscow).
 December 17. OCA - The Lives of the Saints.
 The Autonomous Orthodox Metropolia of Western Europe and the Americas (ROCOR). St. Hilarion Calendar of Saints for the year of our Lord 2004. St. Hilarion Press (Austin, TX). p. 94.
 December 17. Latin Saints of the Orthodox Patriarchate of Rome.
 The Roman Martyrology. Transl. by the Archbishop of Baltimore. Last Edition, According to the Copy Printed at Rome in 1914. Revised Edition, with the Imprimatur of His Eminence Cardinal Gibbons. Baltimore: John Murphy Company, 1916.
Greek Sources
 Great Synaxaristes:  17 ΔΕΚΕΜΒΡΙΟΥ. ΜΕΓΑΣ ΣΥΝΑΞΑΡΙΣΤΗΣ.
  Συναξαριστής. 17 Δεκεμβρίου. ECCLESIA.GR. (H ΕΚΚΛΗΣΙΑ ΤΗΣ ΕΛΛΑΔΟΣ). 
Russian Sources
  30 декабря (17 декабря). Православная Энциклопедия под редакцией Патриарха Московского и всея Руси Кирилла (электронная версия). (Orthodox Encyclopedia - Pravenc.ru).
  17 декабря (ст.ст.) 30 декабря 2013 (нов. ст.). Русская Православная Церковь Отдел внешних церковных связей. (DECR).

December in the Eastern Orthodox calendar